The 1997 Toyota Atlantic Championship season was contested over 12 rounds. All teams had to utilize Toyota engines. The KOOL Toyota Atlantic Championship Drivers' Champion was Alex Barron driving for Lynx Racing. In C2-class 14 different drivers competed, but none of them for the whole season.

Calendar

Note:

Race 1 held on the road course.

Race 10 stopped earlier due to rain, originally scheduled over 17 laps.

Final points standings

Driver

Main championship
For every race the points were awarded: 20 points to the winner, 16 for runner-up, 14 for third place, 12 for fourth place, 11 for fifth place, winding down to 1 point for 15th place. Lower placed drivers did not award points. Additional points were awarded to the pole winner (1 point) and to the driver leading the most laps (1 point). C2-class drivers were also able to score points in the main class.

C2-Class championship

Points system see above. But additional points only awarded for the fastest qualifier. No additional point awarded to the driver leading the most laps.

Note:

No more competitors in C2-class.

See also
1997 CART season
1997 Indy Lights season
1996–1997 Indy Racing League season

External links
ChampCarStats.com

References
 "The Atlantic championship" , of John Zimmermann

Atlantic
Atlantic Season, 1997
Atlantic Championship seasons
Atlantic